Kyle Keith Shewfelt (born May 6, 1982 in Calgary, Alberta) is a Canadian gymnast.  His gold medal in the men's floor exercise competition at the 2004 Athens Olympics was the first-ever medal for a Canadian in an artistic gymnastics event and was the first Canadian gold of the 2004 Olympics. He also has a vault named after him.

Shewfelt was considered a medal threat in advance of the Athens games. In the end, Shewfelt finished first on Floor and fourth on Vault.

Gymnastics career
Born in Calgary, he first began practicing gymnastics in 1988 influenced by a neighbour.  His father was also an athlete playing for the Brandon Wheat Kings hockey team.  While Shewfelt was a skilled hockey player he turned to gymnastics at an early age.   He attended Calgary's National Sport School in order to complete his high school education, while pursuing his Olympic plans with fellow athletes at the school   Kyle trained at Altadore Gymnastic Club under coach Kelly Manjak, from age six up until the 2004 Olympics. Manjak married in 2004 and moved following the Olympics to Ontario. Shewfelt stayed in Calgary, training with coach Tony Smith at the University of Calgary.

In 2000 Kyle was unexpectedly, due to his young age, selected for the Sydney Olympics. He competed in the individual floor and vault event qualifications in ranks of 12 and 26, respectively, and did not qualify to the finals in either.

He caught the attention of judges performing a new vault, a Yurchenko with two and one half twists. The new move was ratified by the judges and subsequently named the Shewfelt vault.

Shewfelt's long-held goal of Olympic gold was endangered when he severely bruised the talus bone in his ankle in March 2004, but he made a full recovery in time for Athens.  Before the Olympics Shewfelt has speculated on moving to Cirque du Soleil after his athletic career is over.  A gold medal could easily open many other opportunities for him, however, as he has instantaneously become a household name in much of Canada.

At the 2004 Summer Olympics in Athens, there was some controversy when Shewfelt was marginally edged out by Marian Drăgulescu of Romania with an average combined score of 9.612 to the bronze medal in the individual vault final by 0.013 point despite Drăgulescu falling in his second vault and Shewfelt completing two comparatively well-executed vaults with an average combined score of 9.599.

In 2005 Shewfelt played Kelly Manjak in the Hungarian made film White Palms.

In 2006 Shewfelt made a comeback to the international scene, leading the Canadian team to a gold medal at the Commonwealth Games in Australia, collecting bronze on Floor and gold on Vault for himself.

That same year, Shewfelt helped his team to a second-place finish at the Pacific Alliance competition. In the individual events, Shewfelt placed first on vault and floor.

Next was World Championships in Denmark where Shewfelt led his team to a best ever team ranking (6th) and where he collected another World Championships medal (bronze on Floor Exercise).

In August 2007, Kyle fractured both of his tibias in a fluke landing training for floor exercise just prior to the World Championships in Germany.  Withdrawing from the event, Kyle hoped to heal and get back into training in sufficient time to make a bid for the 2008 Summer Olympic team.

After 11 months of intense rehab and recovery, Kyle was named to his third Canadian Olympic team. He was selected to represent Canada in Beijing after proving that he was in top form at a test competition capping a week-long training camp in Calgary.

At the 2008 Beijing Olympics, Kyle competed in the preliminary artistic gymnastics round. Shewfelt was unable to reach the top eight in either of his specialties (the cut-off for admission to the Olympic finals), finishing ninth in vault and 11th in floor.  Shewfelt received the highest execution score (B score) for the two vaults he  performed  (9.75). After his exit from the Olympics, Kyle became a guest commentator on artistic gymnastics for CBC Television's Olympic coverage.

On May 21, 2009, Shewfelt announced on his blog that he was retiring from competition.

"After much thought and consideration, I have come to the decision that it's time to hang up the grips, put away the stinky gym shoes, remove the singlet, take my hands out of the chalk bucket and start embarking on new journeys," Shewfelt wrote.

Later life
During the 2012 London Olympics he served as a gymnastics analyst for the CTV Television Network-led Canadian Olympic Broadcast Media Consortium.

In 2018 he was working as a gymnastics coach.

In 2021 he published an autobiography, Make it Happen.

Routine skills
Vault: 2½-Twisting Yurchenko (The Shewfelt); Double-Twisting Tsukahara
Floor: (2004) 1½ Whip, Full Twist, Rudi; 2½ Twist, Front Layout, 1¾ Front; Full Twisting Back handspring; Layout Arabian with Full Twist; Double Twisting Double Back (2008) Arabian Double Piked Front; 1½ Twist to a Full Twist, Front Layout with 1¾ Front Dive; 2½ Twist to a 1.5 Twist, Layout Arabian with Full Twist, Double Twisting Double Back
Horizontal Bar: Deff, Tkatchev, piked stalder, Full pirouette, Double Twisting Double Layout

Competitive history

2000 season

2004 season

2006 season

2008 season

References

External links
 
 

1982 births
Living people
Canadian male artistic gymnasts
Commonwealth Games gold medallists for Canada
Gymnasts at the 2000 Summer Olympics
Gymnasts at the 2004 Summer Olympics
Gymnasts at the 2008 Summer Olympics
Medalists at the World Artistic Gymnastics Championships
Olympic gold medalists for Canada
Olympic gymnasts of Canada
Sportspeople from Calgary
Gymnasts at the 2002 Commonwealth Games
Gymnasts at the 2006 Commonwealth Games
Olympic medalists in gymnastics
Medalists at the 2004 Summer Olympics
Commonwealth Games bronze medallists for Canada
Commonwealth Games medallists in gymnastics
Originators of elements in artistic gymnastics
Medallists at the 2002 Commonwealth Games
Medallists at the 2006 Commonwealth Games